NeuroAiD is a herbal supplement proposed to support functional recovery after strokes. There were two formulations of NeuroAiD: MLC601 (NeuroAiDTM) was first developed. Since 2018 MLC601 formulation is no longer on the market, and has been replaced by MLC901 (NeuroAiDTMII), a simplified formulation containing only 9 botanical ingredients. It can be administered orally or through a feeding tube.

Research has found the drug to be of no benefit for aiding stroke recovery.

Common side effects include abdominal discomfort, headaches, dry mouth, nausea, vomiting, and diarrhea. Though very rare, some patients have reported serious adverse events in clinical trials (jaundice, hypokalemia, seizures, and recurring strokes).

NeuroAiD was first registered and marketed in China in 2001. It was patented in the United States in 2013, but has not been approved by the FDA. NeuroAiD is distributed by Moleac, and is derived from traditional Chinese medicine. According to the CEO of Moleac, NeuroAiD is sold in at least 25 countries, and 20,000 people have taken it.

Composition
NeuroAiD I, or MLC601, is composed of nine herbal components (astragalus root, Salvia miltiorrhiza root, chishao, rhizome lovage, Angelica sinensis root, safflower, peach, thinleaf milkwort root, and grassleaf sweet flag rhizome) and five components derived from animals (Hirudo medicinalis, Eupolyphaga seu steleophaga, Calculus bovis artifactus, Buthus martensii, and Cornu saigae tataricae). NeuroAiDTMII, or MLC901, is a simpler form of the medication that only contains the nine herbal components without the animal components. Since 2018, MLC601 formulation is no longer marketed.

Pharmacology 
Laboratory studies suggest that NeuroAiD can aid with stroke recovery by improving neuroprotection, neurogenesis, and neuroplasticity by amplifying endogenous processes of self-protection and self-repair of the brain. MLC901 can activate KATP channels, which has a neuroprotective effect against brain ischemia.

Effectiveness 
Neuroaid is not effective in aiding recovery after stroke.

Contraindications 

The medication is contraindicated in pregnant and breastfeeding women.

Approvals and patents
NeuroAiD was approved by the Sino Food and Drug Administration in August 2001, under the name Danqi Piantan Jiaonang. NeuroAiD has also been approved for use in other Asian countries such as Singapore. In 2006, NeuroAiD was also chosen for the Chinese Ministry of Science and Technology's Key Technologies Research & Development program.

In 2013, Moleac filed a patent for NeuroAiD with the European Patent Office, which was eventually approved in 2019. In the same year, Moleac also filed a patent application with the U.S. Patent Office.

References 

Traditional Chinese medicine